Daniele Bracciali and Potito Starace won the tournament, beating Frank Moser and Alexander Satschko 6–3, 6–4

Seeds

Draw

Draw

References

 Main Draw

AON Open Challenger - Doubles
2014 Doubles
AON